Rauf Dhomi (Albanian: Rauf Domi) (born 4 December 1945) is a Kosovan classical music composer and conductor and a teacher at the University of Pristina. Dhomi is the author of many operas, requiems, masses, cantatas, symphonic music, film scores and theater music.

Early life and education
Dhomi was born in Gjakova, Yugoslavia – in present-day Kosovo.  He attended to school in Prizren and studied composing and conducting in Sarajevo.

Career
Dhomi was presented with a Presidential Medal of Merits for his contribution to the culture of Kosovo.

References 

1945 births
Living people
Musicians from Gjakova
20th-century classical composers
21st-century classical composers
Kosovan composers
Academic staff of the University of Pristina
Kosovan conductors (music)
Male classical composers
20th-century conductors (music)
21st-century conductors (music)
20th-century male musicians
21st-century male musicians
Members of the Academy of Sciences and Arts of Kosovo